George of York, Duke of Bedford (March 1477 – March 1479) was the eighth child and third son of Edward IV of England and Elizabeth Woodville.

George was born in Windsor Castle in March 1477, and was created Duke of Bedford in infancy, probably in 1478, after the former holder of the title, George Neville, was deprived of the title by act of Parliament, ostensibly for lack of money to maintain the style of a duke. He was appointed the Lord Lieutenant of Ireland in 1478, one of a series of nominal and largely absent lieutenants.

George died aged two. This is considered likely to have been due to an outbreak of bubonic plague. He was buried in St George's Chapel at Windsor Castle on 22 March 1479.

Notes

References
  pages 139–140.

1477 births
1479 deaths
15th-century English people
People from Windsor, Berkshire
George Plantagenet, Duke of Bedford
Infectious disease deaths in England
15th-century deaths from plague (disease)
Children of Edward IV of England
Burials at St George's Chapel, Windsor Castle
Royalty and nobility who died as children
Dukes of Bedford
Sons of kings